The Lengupá Province is a province of Boyacá Department, Colombia. The province is formed by 6 municipalities.

Etymology 
The name of the province and the Lengupá River, after which the province is named, is possibly derived from the Chibcha words Len: "site"; Gua: "of the river"; Paba: "father" or "chief".

Subdivision 
Lengupá Province comprises 6 municipalities:
 Miraflores
 Berbeo
 Campohermoso
 Páez
 San Eduardo
 Zetaquirá

References 

Provinces of Boyacá Department
Province